The People's Revolutionary Bloc (Spanish: , abbreviated BPR) was a Salvadoran militant organization that was founded by the Farabundo Martí Liberation People's Forces (FLP) in 1975. The BPR was mainly composed intellectuals, teachers, students, and rural peasants and workers. The group was led by General-Secretary Julio Flores.

See also 

Farabundo Martí Liberation People's Forces

References 

1970s establishments in El Salvador
1990s disestablishments in El Salvador
1995 disestablishments in North America
Communism in El Salvador
Defunct communist militant groups
Defunct organizations based in El Salvador
Farabundo Martí National Liberation Front
Guerrilla movements in Latin America
Insurgent groups in North America
Organizations disestablished in 1995
Organizations established in 1975
Paramilitary organizations based in El Salvador
Salvadoran Civil War